Hasan Minhaj (born September 23, 1985) is an American comedian, writer, producer, political commentator, actor, and television host of Indian descent. His Netflix show Patriot Act with Hasan Minhaj won two Peabody Awards and two Webby Awards.

After working as a stand-up comedian and appearing in minor television roles, Minhaj came to prominence for his work on The Daily Show as its senior correspondent from 2014 to 2018. He was the featured speaker at the 2017 White House Correspondents’ Dinner. His first stand-up comedy special, Homecoming King, was released on Netflix on May 23, 2017, received positive reviews from critics and won him his first Peabody Award in 2018.

Minhaj left The Daily Show in August 2018 to host a weekly comedy show, Patriot Act with Hasan Minhaj, which debuted on Netflix on October 28, 2018. In April 2019, he won his second Peabody Award for Patriot Act, and was included on Times annual list of the 100 most influential people in the world.

Minhaj appeared in season two of the Apple TV+ drama series The Morning Show in a recurring role.

Early life
Hasan Minhaj was born on September 23, 1985, in Davis, California, to Indian Muslim parents from Aligarh, Uttar Pradesh. His parents, Najme and Seema Minhaj (née Usmani) immigrated to the United States from India. After his birth, he and his father, an organic chemist, remained in the United States. His mother returned to India for eight years to complete medical school, visiting the U.S. after three years to give birth to his sister in 1989. He attended Davis Senior High School, graduating in 2003. Minhaj then attended the University of California, Davis, from which he graduated with a Bachelor of Arts degree in political science in 2007.

Career

2000s
While in college, he became interested in comedy after seeing Chris Rock's Never Scared, the first stand-up special he watched. He began traveling to San Francisco to perform. In 2008, he won Wild 94.9's "Best Comic Standing" competition, which resulted in his working as an opening act for Katt Williams, Pablo Francisco, and Gabriel Iglesias. He also worked part-time for the website Ning, an experience he used to write comedy. Minhaj lists Kevin Shea, W. Kamau Bell, and Arj Barker as inspirations.

In 2009, Minhaj moved to Los Angeles to perform on NBC's Stand-up for Diversity, on which he was a finalist.

2010s
In 2011, he was recurring on the TV sitcom State of Georgia and starred in various roles on the MTV hidden camera show Disaster Date. Through posting on YouTube, he was cast as the host of Failosophy on MTV. In 2013, Minhaj appeared in guest roles on Arrested Development and Getting On. He hosted Stand Up Planet in 2013 and a web series, The Truth with Hasan Minhaj, in 2014. In 2014, he voiced Rabi Ray Rana in the video game Far Cry 4.

On November 19, 2014, Minhaj joined The Daily Show as a correspondent, the last one hired by then-host Jon Stewart. Minhaj was asked to come in for an audition with new material after he sent in a tape of him performing an idea for a Daily Show segment, but he initially panicked as he had no other material prepared. The Friday before Minhaj's audition, Ben Affleck and Bill Maher got into a heated exchange about Islam on Maher's show, and Minhaj used this for a new sketch he called "Batman vs. Bill Maher".

On June 18, 2016, Minhaj performed a set as the host of the annual Radio and Television Correspondents Dinner. The set gained attention for his condemnation of the United States Congress' inaction in passing gun control legislation.

On April 29, 2017, Minhaj was the featured speaker at the 2017 White House Correspondents' Dinner, where he took on the traditional role of roasting Washington, D.C. society, national politics, current events, the current president, the Washington press corps, and the American media. He criticized U.S. President Donald Trump, who was boycotting the dinner, calling him the "liar in chief," and reminded the press to do their job.

Minhaj's one-man show, Homecoming King, debuted Off-Broadway in October 2015. The show featured a central theme of the immigrant experience in the United States today, illustrated with stories from Minhaj's life as a second-generation Indian-American Muslim. He later turned the show into his first stand-up special, Hasan Minhaj: Homecoming King, which premiered on Netflix on May 23, 2017. The special was filmed at the Mondavi Center at Minhaj's alma mater, UC Davis, in January 2017, and won a television Peabody Award.

In March 2018, Netflix announced that Minhaj would host his own weekly show on the platform. The new show, entitled Patriot Act with Hasan Minhaj, premiered on October 28, 2018. The show received an initial order of 32 episodes. Patriot Act explores the modern cultural, political and economic landscape. In April 2019, Minhaj was listed among TIMEs 100 most influential people in the world, and won his second Peabody Award for Patriot Act. Some months after Minhaj's episode on the student loan crisis aired, he was called to testify regarding the issue before the US Congress in September 2019. In August 2020, Minhaj announced the series would not be renewed after 40 episodes.

On November 27, 2018, Comedy Central aired a special titled Goatface, featuring Minhaj, Fahim Anwar, Asif Ali, and Aristotle Athari. In February 2019, Minhaj played on the "Away" roster during the NBA All-Star Celebrity Game at the Bojangles' Coliseum in Charlotte, North Carolina.

In September 2019, he testified during a U.S. House Committee on Financial Services hearing on student loan debt.

2020s
On November 13, 2020, it was announced that Minhaj would join season 2 of the Apple TV+ drama The Morning Show in a recurring role.

In 2021-2022, Minhaj performed a comedy tour across the United States that culminated in the release of a Netflix special The King's Jester in October 2022.

On October 30, 2022, Minhaj appeared as a contestant on Celebrity Jeopardy!, where his animated and over-the-top reactions earned him the dubious accolade of 'most annoying contestant ever' by the show's long time fans.

Influences
Minhaj has said his comedy influences include Richard Pryor, Dave Chappelle, Trevor Noah, Junot Diaz, Jon Stewart, Chris Rock, and Stephen Colbert.

Personal life and family
Minhaj is Muslim. He considers himself "non-dogmatic" and has expressed his liberal Islamic beliefs.

In January 2015, Minhaj married his longtime partner Beena Patel, whom he had met in college. Patel received a Doctor of Public Health in 2013 and has since worked with homeless patients and is management consultant for MedAmerica. According to Minhaj in his comedy special The King's Jester, he and his wife dated for ten years before he proposed to her. Minhaj and Patel are both second-generation Indian Americans; she is a Hindu of Gujarati descent, and he is a Muslim of Uttar Pradeshi descent, something he discussed in his comedy special, Hasan Minhaj: Homecoming King. The couple lived in New York City prior to the pandemic, but have since moved to nearby Greenwich, Connecticut. They have a daughter (born April 2018) and a son (born February 2020).

In addition to English, Minhaj is fluent in his native language of Hindustani.

Minhaj has spoken about his and his wife's struggle to conceive. After his wife convinced him to go to a fertility clinic, it was determined the issue was with his own fertility rather than his wife's. Minhaj underwent a varicocele repair procedure, after discovering there was too much blood in his scrotum.  The couple was able to have two children.

Minhaj is a fan of the Sacramento Kings, having grown up nearby. His son had a Kings-themed first birthday party and he has previously considered becoming part-owner of the team.

Filmography

Film

Television

Video games

Awards and nominations

See also
 Improvisational Comedy
 Indians in the New York City metropolitan area
 Political satire

Notes

References

External links

21st-century American comedians
21st-century American male actors
American male comedians
American male television actors
American male actors of Indian descent
American comedians of Indian descent
Muslim male comedians
American Muslims
Comedians from California
Male actors from California
The New Yorker people
Peabody Award winners
University of California, Davis alumni
People from Davis, California
Davis Senior High School (California) alumni
1985 births
Living people